Green Fairfield (Old English Green, beautiful open-land). is a civil parish in Derbyshire, England. The population of the civil parish (including Tunstead) was 100. Woo Dale lies within the parish. Green Fairfield's coordinates are 53.2511, -1.8588.

See also
Listed buildings in Green Fairfield

References

Civil parishes in Derbyshire